This is a list of Japanese football transfers in the winter transfer window 2014–2015 by club.

J. League Division 1

Gamba Osaka  

In:

Out:

Urawa Red Diamonds 

In:

Out:

Kashima Antlers 

In:

Out:

Kashiwa Reysol 

In:

Out:

Sagan Tosu 

In:

Out:

Kawasaki Frontale 

In:

Out:

Yokohama F. Marinos 

In:

Out:

Sanfrecce Hiroshima 

In:

Out:

F.C. Tokyo 

In:

Out:

Nagoya Grampus 

In:

Out:

Vissel Kobe 

In:

Out:

Albirex Niigata 

In:

Out:

Ventforet Kofu 

In:

Out:

Vegalta Sendai 

In:

Out:

Shimizu S-Pulse 

In:

Out:

Shonan Bellmare 

In:

Out:

Matsumoto Yamaga 

In:

Out:

Montedio Yamagata 

In:

Out:

J. League Division 2

Omiya Ardija 

In:

Out:

Cerezo Osaka 

In:

Out:

Tokushima Vortis 

In:

Out:

JEF United Chiba 

In:

Out:

Jùbilo Iwata 

In:

Out:

Giravanz Kitakyushu 

In:

Out:

Oita Trinita 

In:

Out:

Fagiano Okayama 

In:

Out:

Kyoto Sanga 

In:

Out:

Consadole Sapporo 

In:

Out:

Yokohama F.C. 

In:

Out:

Tochigi S.C. 

In:

Out:

Roasso Kumamoto 

In:

Out:

V-Varen Nagasaki 

In:

Out:

Mito Hollyhock 

In:

Out:

Avispa Fukuoka 

In:

Out:

FC Gifu 

In:

Out:

Thespakusatsu Gunma 

In:

Out:

Ehime FC 

In:

Out:

Tokyo Verdy 

In:

Out:

Kamatamare Sanuki 

In:

Out:

Zweigen Kanazawa 

In:

Out:

J. League Division 3

Kataller Toyama 

In:

Out:

Nagano Parceiro 

In:

Out:

Machida Zelvia 

In:

Out:

Out:

Grulla Morioka 

In:

Out:

SC Sagamihara 

In:

Out:

Fukushima United 

In:

Out:

Blaublitz Akita 

In:

Out:

F.C. Ryukyu 

In:

Out:

Fujieda MYFC 

In:

Out:

Y.S.S.C. 

In:

Out:

Renofa Yamaguchi 

In:

Out:

References 

Transfers
Transfers
Japan
2014-15